Dearlove is a surname. Notable people with the surname include:

Alfred Dearlove (1869–1955), English cricketer
Des Dearlove (born 1963), British journalist and business theorist
Jack Dearlove (1911–1967), English rower
Paul Dearlove (born 1979), Scottish rugby union player
Richard Dearlove (born 1945), British intelligence officer